Raised by Wolves is a British television sitcom written by Caitlin Moran and her sister Caroline Moran, first broadcast between 2013 and 2016. It follows a loose account of the siblings' youth in Wolverhampton, transposed to the modern day. Helen Monks and Alexa Davies star as the oldest sisters in a large family raised by an unconventional single mother.

Broadcast history
A pilot episode was developed by the BBC and broadcast on Channel 4 on 23 December 2013, and the show was subsequently ordered to series. A six-part series began broadcasting on Channel 4 on 16 March 2015. The first series attracted an average of 1.3 million viewers and 6.3% share of audience per episode, making it Channel 4's second highest-rating comedy of 2015. A second six-part series was filmed in late 2015, which began broadcasting on 2 March 2016. The show was cancelled on 9 August 2016 due to Channel 4's "commitments to new programmes" for the following year.

On 18 October 2016, the Moran sisters launched a Kickstarter campaign to raise money to make a third series of the show. The plan was to make a special one-off episode if the campaign received £320,000 by 20 November 2016; or to make a third series (to be premiered in late 2017) if more than £320,000 was donated. The campaign was unsuccessful and plans for a third series were cancelled.

Cast 
 Rebekah Staton as Della Garry
 Philip Jackson as Grampy
 Helen Monks as Germaine Garry
 Alexa Davies as Aretha Garry
 Molly Risker as Yoko Garry
 Caden Ellis Wall as Wyatt Garry
 Kaine Zajaz as Lee Rhind
 Erin Freeman as Mariah Garry
 Brandon Fellows as Callum
 Erin Kellyman as Cathy
 Paul Higgins as Sean (Series 2)

Episodes

Pilot (2013)

Series 1 (2015)

Series 2 (2016)

Reception
Raised by Wolves was generally well received by critics: The Daily Telegraph called it "terrific" and "refreshingly honest", as "every one-liner was a zinger"; while The Independent described it as "great fun" and with "joie de vivre to spare"; and The Guardian described it as a "loving and funny sitcom".

Amidst this acclaim, the Glasgow Herald complained about the focus on a character's first period in the pilot episode, labelling the comedy "a bloody mess".

With the arrival of the second series in 2016, the Radio Times declared that "the comedy gets even better. And filthier."

American series
It was announced in January 2017 that ABC would be remaking the series with Diablo Cody as writer and Greg Berlanti producing. In February it was announced that Georgia King would play the lead.

References

External links

2013 British television series debuts
2016 British television series endings
2010s British sitcoms
Channel 4 sitcoms
English-language television shows
Television series about dysfunctional families
Television shows set in the West Midlands (county)
Television series by Big Talk Productions
Wolverhampton